St Christopher's Chapel may refer to:

St Christopher's Chapel, Queensland, Australia
St Christopher's Chapel, Great Ormond Street Hospital, London, UK

See also
St. Christopher's Church (disambiguation)